"You Were.../Ballad" is Japanese singer Ayumi Hamasaki's forty-seventh (forty-eighth overall) single, released on December 29, 2009. The single was intended to be released on December 16, but Avex Trax pushed the release date two weeks back. The first song on the single "You were..." is the theme song for the Japanese version of the Disney movie Tinker Bell and the Lost Treasure, while the second song "Ballad" is tied up with The Firmament of the Pleiades, a NHK's historical and political drama based on Jiro Asada's book of the same name.
The single became Hamasaki's 22nd consecutive single to debut at number-one position since her 2002 single "Free & Easy" on the Oricon weekly charts, making her the first solo artist and the female artist to have 22 consecutive singles to debut at number-one position. It is also her 34th number-one single on the Oricon weekly charts.

Promotion
During December 2009, Hamasaki performed live on Japanese TV shows seven times.  Hamasaki was featured on the cover of four Japanese magazines during the promotion of the single. These magazines were "Sweet", "Bea's Up", "Vivi" and "S Cawaii". As of early December,  there have been many promotional pictures posted around Shibuya, Shinagawa and Harajuku in Tokyo.

Music videos
You Were featured Ayumi at a winter-like scene wearing a blinking, electrically-lit dress. The video is also inter-cut with scenes of models posing in haute couture outfits.

The video for Ballad featured an elaborate storyline where Ayumi and her boyfriend get in a motorcycle accident. Her boyfriend becomes comatose and in his dreams he tries to contact Ayumi via letters, not realizing that his letters would never reach her. The video is intercut with scenes where Ayumi is singing at a fairyland/dream setting.

Track listing 
All lyrics written by Ayumi Hamasaki.

CD Only

CD+DVD Version A

CD+DVD Version B

Charts

Oricon Sales Chart

Billboard Japan

References 

2009 singles
Ayumi Hamasaki songs
Oricon Weekly number-one singles
Songs written by Ayumi Hamasaki
Songs written by Dai Nagao
2009 songs
Avex Trax singles